Bergwitz is a village and a former municipality in Wittenberg district in Saxony-Anhalt, Germany. Since 1 July 2005 it is part of the town Kemberg. Bergwitz is known regionally for the Bergwitzsee (Bergwitz lake) as a tourist recreation area.

Geography 
Bergwitz is located on the edge of the Düben Heath, about 15 kilometers from Lutherstadt Wittenberg and 60 kilometers from Leipzig and Halle (Saale).

History 
The area was already settled in the Bronze Age about 3000 years ago.

On 1 July 2005, the municipality of Bergwitz with its subdivision of Klitzschena, was amalgamated with Kemberg.

Main sights 
Bergwitz is well known for its lake.

Transport 
Bergwitz lies on Federal Highway (Bundesstraße) B 100 from Lutherstadt Wittenberg via Bitterfeld to Halle (Saale) and on Landesstraße L129 from Selbitz to Kemberg.
Klitzschena lies on district road K2041 from Bergwitz to Seegrehna. Bundesautobahn 9 (Munich - Berlin) can be reached by the Dessau Ost or Vockerode interchange 22 km away.

Bergwitz railway station lies on the Deutsche Bahn line between Wittenberg and Leipzig/ Halle. It is part of Mitteldeutscher Verkehrsverbund. From 1903 to 1951, there was a railway connection between Bergwitz and Kemberg. The former station has been demolished.

References

External links 
Town of Kemberg
Bergwitz lake
Verwaltungsgemeinschaft's website

Former municipalities in Saxony-Anhalt
Kemberg